Ana Blandiana (pen name of Otilia Valeria Coman; born 25 March 1942, in Timișoara) is a Romanian poet, essayist, and political figure. She is considered one of the famous contemporary Romanian authors. She took her name after Blandiana, near Vințu de Jos, Alba County, her mother's home village.

In October 2017, she was announced as The Griffin Trust For Excellence In Poetry's twelfth recipient of their Lifetime Recognition Award.

Literary career

Ana Blandiana was born Otilia Valeria Coman on 25 March 1942. Her parents were Gheorghe (1915-1964), an orthodox priest and former member of the fascist Iron Guard who spent years in Communist prisons and died in an accident weeks after his release in a general amnesty, and Otilia (Diacu), an accountant. Her sister Geta was born in 1947. In 1960 she married the writer Romulus Rusan.

After her debut in 1959, in Tribuna, Cluj, where she signed for the first time as Ana Blandiana, she was published in the anthology 30 de poeți tineri ("30 Young Poets"). In 1963, after a four-year interdiction due to her father's status, she again published in Contemporanul (edited by George Ivașcu).
 
Her editorial debut took place in 1964 with the booklet of poems Persoana întâia plural ("First Person Plural"), with a Foreword written by Nicolae Manolescu. She became known for her Calcâiul vulnerabil ("Achilles' Heel", 1966) and A treia taină ("The Third Secret", 1969). In 1966, Blandiana appeared for the first time at the International Poem Contest (in Lahti, Finland).
 
In 1967, she settled in Bucharest; until the following year, she was one of the editors for Viața studențească, and then (until 1975) worked as editor for Amfiteatru. She gave two televised readings in 1969, in the company of Andrei Șerban and the actors Irina Petrescu, Mariana Mihuț, and Florian Pittiș.
 
Between 1975 and 1977, she was a librarian at the Institute of Fine Arts in Bucharest. In 1976, her works were first printed in a French translation, in Croisière du Club des Poètes by :fr:Jean-Pierre Rosnay (Paris); in 1978, she took part in the First International Festival of Poetry in Paris organized by the famed Club des Poètes.

In the late 1980s, Blandiana started writing protest poems against the communist regime.

In 1984 Blandiana's poem 'Totul' ('Everything') was briefly published in the literary magazine Amfiteatru. 'Totul' was a list of elements of everyday life in Bucharest at the time, composed as a comment on the contrast between the official view of life in Romania and the alternative perception of its monotonous shabbiness. The critical nature of the poem led to the edition of Amfiteatru being withdrawn within hours of publication with the editors being dismissed. Nevertheless, the poem appeared in translation in Western media and also had limited underground circulation in Romania.

In 1987 she published at the Sport-Turism Publishing House the book "Orașe de silabe" ("City of syllables") where she writes about all the countries and cities of the world where she travelled: over 100. The same year, 1987, she is published in USSR, at Raduga Publishing House from Moscow, with the Russian title Stihotvorenia, rasskazî, asse. Even though the secret services of Ceaușescu ('Securitate') attribute her a dissident status, in 1989 the Minerva Publishing House is publishing in the most popular mass collection "Biblioteca Pentru Toți" ("Library for all people") an anthology of her poems. Her friends sustain that the book never seen the bookshelves of the libraries. However, "Poezii" ("Poems") has a 'Foreword' written by Eugen Simion.

After the Romanian Revolution of 1989, she entered political life, campaigning for the removal of the communist legacy from administrative office, as well as for an open society. She left literary work in the background, although she did publish Arhitectura valurilor ("Waves' Architecture", 1990), 100 de poeme ("100 Poems", 1991), and Sertarul cu aplauze ("The Drawer of Applause", prose, 1992). In 1992 she advocates for the released from prison of old time Party member Gheorghe 'Gogu' Radulescu, a former member of the Executive Political Committee of the Central Committee of the Communist Party and protector of herself during the communist period.

Ana Blandiana has also published: 50 de poeme, ("50 Poems"), 1970: Octombrie, Noiembrie, Decembrie ("October, November, December"), 1972; Întâmplări din grădina mea (Occurrences in My Garden), 1980; Ora de nisip ("The Hour of Sand"), 1984; Întâmplări de pe strada mea (Occurrences on My Street), 1988; În dimineața de după moarte ("On the Morning After Dying"), 1996; La cules îngeri ("Angel Gathering"), 1997; Cartea albă a lui Arpagic ("Arpagic's White Book"), 1998. She has also authored 6 books of essays and 4 books of other prose writings. Her work was translated into 16 languages.

Ora de nisip ("The Hour of Sand") has been translated into English by Peter Jay and Anca Cristofovici.

Presence in English language anthologies 

 2019 -Testament - 400 Years of Romanian Poetry/400 de ani de poezie românească - Minerva Publishing 2019 - Daniel Ioniță (editor and principal translator), with Daniel Reynaud, Adriana Paul, and Eva Foster. 
 2020 - Romanian Poetry from its Origins to the Present - bilingual edition - Daniel Ioniță (editor and principal translator) with Daniel Reynaud, Adriana Paul, and Eva Foster - Australian-Romanian Academy Publishing - 2020 -  ; 
 Testament - Anthology of Romanian Verse - American Edition - monolingual English language edition - Daniel Ioniță (editor and principal translator) with Eva Foster, Daniel Reynaud, and Rochelle Bews - Australian-Romanian Academy for Culture - 2017 - 
 Born in Utopia - An anthology of Modern and Contemporary Romanian Poetry - Carmen Firan and Paul Doru Mugur (editors) with Edward Foster - Talisman House Publishers - 2006 - 
 The Phantom Church and Other Stories from Romania - Georgiana Farnoaga and Sharon King (editors and translators) - University of Pittsburgh Press - 1997 -

Affiliations
 Member of the Writers' Union of Romania
 Member of the European Academy of Poetry
 1990- 2004 President of the Romanian PEN Club (after its re-establishment  in 1990)
 1994 - Founder and leader of the Civic Alliance Foundation, a Romanian non-party movement, whose aim was to alleviate the consequences of more than fifty years of communism in Romania.

References

  Biography at the Civic Alliance site
  Books and other writings by Ana Bladiana at LiterNet.ro site
  Biography and propaganda poems at the Civic Media site including her profile made by the Central Committee of the Communist Party

1942 births
Living people
Writers from Timișoara
People of the Romanian Revolution
Romanian activists
Romanian women activists
Romanian children's writers
Romanian essayists
Romanian journalists
20th-century Romanian poets
Romanian women short story writers
Romanian short story writers
Romanian women essayists
Romanian women children's writers
Romanian women poets
International Writing Program alumni
20th-century short story writers
20th-century essayists
Herder Prize recipients
20th-century Romanian women writers
Struga Poetry Evenings Golden Wreath laureates